The Koreans: Who They Are, What They Want, Where Their Future Lies is a 1998 non-fiction book by British journalist Michael Breen. It was first published in 1998 by Thomas Dunne Books.

Later, Breen authored The New Koreans: The Story of a Nation.

References

Further reading
The New Koreans: The Story of a Nation. Thomas Dunne Books, 2017. .

External links
The Koreans at Google Books

1998 non-fiction books
British non-fiction literature
Politics of Korea
Books about Korea
Thomas Dunne Books books